This is a list of primary and secondary schools directly operated by the government of Hong Kong.

Hong Kong Island and Islands District
Central and Western District
 King's College (secondary)
 Bonham Road Government Primary School
 (李陞小學)

Eastern District
 Belilios Public School (secondary)
 Clementi Secondary School
 Shau Kei Wan East Government Secondary School 
 Shau Kei Wan Government Secondary School
 Aldrich Bay Government Primary School (愛秩序灣官立小學)
 North Point Government Primary School (北角官立小學)
 Shau Kei Wan Government Primary School (筲箕灣官立小學)
 Formerly spelled Shaukiwan Government Primary School

 Islands District
  (長洲官立中學)

 Southern District
 Hong Kong Southern District Government Primary School (香港南區官立小學)
 Island Road Government Primary School (香島道官立小學)

 Wan Chai District
  (何東中學)
 Queen's College (secondary)
 Tang Shiu Kin Victoria Government Secondary School
 Hennessy Road Government Primary School (軒尼詩道官立小學)
 Hennessy Road Government Primary School (Causeway Bay) (軒尼詩道官立小學（銅鑼灣）)
 North Point Government Primary School (Cloud View Road) (北角官立小學（雲景道）)
 Sir Ellis Kadoorie (Sookunpo) Primary School

Kowloon
 Kowloon City District
  (藝術與科技教育中心) (secondary)
  (何文田官立中學)
 Jockey Club Government Secondary School (賽馬會官立中學)
  (農圃道官立小學)
 Kowloon Tong Government Primary School (九龍塘官立小學)
 Ma Tau Chung Government Primary School (馬頭涌官立小學)
 Ma Tau Chung Government Primary School (Hung Hom Bay) (馬頭涌官立小學（紅磡灣）)

 Kwun Tong District
 Kwun Tong Government Secondary School (觀塘官立中學)
 Kwun Tong Kung Lok Government Secondary School (觀塘功樂官立中學)
 Kwun Tong Government Primary School (Sau Ming Road) (觀塘官立小學〈秀明道〉)
 Kwun Tong Government Primary School (觀塘官立小學)

 Sai Kung District
  (將軍澳官立中學)
 Tseung Kwan O Government Primary School (將軍澳官立小學)

 Sham Shui Po District
 Kowloon Technical School (九龍工業學校)
 Fuk Wing Street Government Primary School (福榮街官立小學)
 Li Cheng Uk Government Primary School (李鄭屋官立小學)
 In 1994 it had significant numbers of students with origins from India and the Philippines.
 Sham Shui Po Government Primary School (深水埗官立小學)

 Wong Tai Sin District
 Lung Cheung Government Secondary School
 Wong Tai Sin Government Primary School (黃大仙官立小學)
 Formerly spelled Wongtaisin Government Primary School

 Yau Tsim Mong District
 Queen Elizabeth School (secondary)
 Sir Ellis Kadoorie Secondary School (West Kowloon)
 Canton Road Government Primary School (廣東道官立小學)
 Jordan Road Government Primary School (佐敦道官立小學)
 Tong Mei Road Government Primary School (塘尾道官立小學)

New Territories
 North District
  (粉嶺官立中學)
 Sheung Shui Government Secondary School
 Fanling Government Primary School (粉嶺官立小學)
 Sha Tin District
 Helen Liang Memorial Secondary School (Shatin) (secondary)
 Sha Tin Government Secondary School
 Sha Tin Government Primary School (沙田官立小學)
 Tai Po District
 New Territories Heung Yee Kuk Tai Po District Secondary School
 Tai Po Government Primary School (大埔官立小學)
 Tsuen Wan District
 Tsuen Wan Government Secondary School
 Hoi Pa Street Government Primary School (海壩街官立小學)
 Tsuen Wan Government Primary School (荃灣官立小學)
 Tuen Mun District
  (南屯門官立中學)
 Tuen Mun Government Secondary School
 Tuen Mun Government Primary School (屯門官立小學)
 Yuen Long District
 Chiu Lut Sau Memorial Secondary School
 New Territories Heung Yee Kuk Yuen Long District Secondary School
 Tin Shui Wai Government Secondary School
 Yuen Long Public Secondary School
 South Yuen Long Government Primary School (南元朗官立小學)
 Tin Shui Wai Government Primary School (天水圍官立小學)
 Yuen Long Government Primary School (元朗官立小學)

Former schools
Former secondary schools:
  (下葵涌官立中學)
  (新界鄉議局南約區中學) - Mui Wo
  (上葵涌官立中學)
 

Former primary schools:
 Chai Wan Government Primary School - Hong Kong Island
 Hollywood Road Government Primary School - Hong Kong Island
 Hung Hom Government Primary School - Later used as the Kowloon Junior School Hung Hom Campus, and the French International School of Hong Kong Hung Hom Campus.
 Java Road Government Primary School
 Jockey Club Government Primary School - Hong Kong Island
 Pokfulam Government Primary School - Now the German Swiss International School Pok Fu Lam Campus.
 Sha Tau Kok Government Primary School - New Territories
 Shek Kip Mei Government Primary School - Kowloon

References

Lists of schools in Hong Kong